Jumana Michael/Mikhail Hanna (born c. 1962) is an Iraqi woman of Assyrian background who was imprisoned at the facility known as Al Kelab Al Sayba, or Loose Dogs, during the rule of Saddam Hussein.

After the fall of Saddam Hussein's regime, Hanna visited the Al Kelab Al Sayba prison in Iraq with a western reporter, resulting in a Washington Post front page story in which she related stories of the atrocities that she had allegedly suffered.

During the visit, she told the reporters that she had been jailed and tortured in the facility, and that her husband had been killed in a nearby prison. The Washington Post story was later mentioned by Paul Wolfowitz while testifying before the United States Senate Committee on Foreign Relations. Hanna was resettled to northern California by US authorities to protect her from possible reprisals.

Sara Solovitch, a journalist based in California, became interested in the story and met with Hanna for a series of interviews, as she intended to write a book about her life. After their first meeting, however, Solovitch began to feel that many of Hanna's stories were "ludicrous" and that hardly any details of her account were true. Her husband, who allegedly had been executed in an Iraqi prison, was in fact still alive. Solovitch's research ultimately revealed that almost every detail of the story was fabricated.

In July 2003, she attested to the Coalition Provisional Authority that she had been tortured during her time in the prison, due to her religious beliefs. The evidence she provided eventually led to nine Iraqi officers being arrested. The nine Iraqi officers arrested on her testimony were released later when it became apparent that little of Ms. Hanna's tale could be verified.

See also

Nayirah testimony
Atrocity propaganda

References

Further reading

External links
Jumana Hanna and Sara Solovitch

Date of birth missing (living people)
Place of birth missing (living people)
1962 births
Living people
American people of Iraqi-Assyrian descent
Iraqi Eastern Catholics
Propaganda legends